Mephitis may refer to:

 Mephitis (genus), a genus of skunks
 Mefitis or Mephitis, a Roman goddess